Night at the Museum: Secret of the Tomb, also called Night at the Museum 3: Secret of the Tomb is a 2014 American fantasy comedy film directed by Shawn Levy and written by David Guion and Michael Handelman. It is the third (and final live-action) installment in the Night at the Museum film series, and a sequel to Battle of the Smithsonian. The film stars Ben Stiller in the lead role, Robin Williams, Owen Wilson, Steve Coogan, Ricky Gervais, Dan Stevens, Rebel Wilson, and Ben Kingsley. In Secret of the Tomb, security guard Larry Daley must travel to London to return the tablet of Ahkmenrah, an Egyptian artifact which causes the exhibits to come to life, before the magic disappears.

Principal photography of Secret of the Tomb took place from January to May 2014 in London, England and British Columbia, Canada. The film premiered on December 11, 2014, at New York City's Ziegfeld Theater and was released in the United States on December 19, 2014. Secret of the Tomb grossed over $363 million at the box office, becoming the lowest-grossing film in the series, and like its predecessors, received mixed reviews. The film is dedicated to Robin Williams and Mickey Rooney, who both died before the film's release.

Plot
In 1938, a team of archaeologists is searching for the tomb of pharaoh Ahkmenrah in Egypt. Among the group is young Cecil "C.J." Fredericks, who discovers the Tablet of Ahkmenrah. As the team packs up the artifacts due to an incoming sandstorm, the locals warn them about removing the tablet from the tomb, saying "the end will come."

Seventy-six years later in New York City, five years after the events of the previous film, Larry Daley remains the night guard of the Museum of Natural History. He and the other exhibits are hosting an event to help re-open the Hayden Planetarium. As Larry makes sure everything is ready, the other exhibits inform him that the museum commissioned a new Neanderthal model resembling Larry. The new Neanderthal calls himself Laaa and considers Larry his father. Later, Ahkmenrah shows Larry that the tablet has a mysterious corrosion. As the corrosion spreads, the exhibits act abnormally and cause massive chaos at the planetarium. After calming the situation, Larry, frustrated, returns home to find his teenage son Nick throwing a party.

To discover what is happening to the tablet, Larry reunites with now-retired Cecil, a member of the expedition who discovered the tomb. Cecil remembers "the end will come" prophecy and realizes it refers to the tablet's magic ending and the exhibits becoming lifeless. Cecil says Ahkmenrah's parents, Merenkahre and Shepseheret, may be able to restore the tablet's power, but that they are in the British Museum. Larry convinces museum curator Dr. McPhee, who was fired due to the planetarium incident, to let him ship Ahkmenrah to London to restore the tablet, although McPhee believes the magic is just clever special effects. Larry and Nick travel the U.K. and go to the British Museum, bypassing the night guard Tilly. Larry discovers that some of the American exhibits have stowed away with Ahkmenrah: Theodore Roosevelt, Sacagawea, Attila the Hun, miniatures Jedediah and Octavius, Dexter the capuchin monkey, and Laaa. As Larry and the others search the museum, the tablet brings the British exhibits to life.

The group is joined by a wax figure of Sir Lancelot, who helps fight off aggressive museum exhibits like a Triceratops skeleton and a Xiangliu statue. The tablet's corrosion worsens, and the American exhibits begin experiencing side-effects such as stiffening limbs and memory reversion. The group finds Ahkmenrah's parents. They learn the tablet's power can be regenerated by moonlight, since it is empowered through the magic of Khonsu. Lancelot steals the tablet, mistaking it for the Holy Grail, and prepares to leave for Camelot. Tilly locks Larry and Laaa in the employee break room, but Attila helps them escape. Laaa remains behind to distract Tilly; they become attracted to each other.

Lancelot crashes the musical Camelot starring Hugh Jackman and Alice Eve and is stunned to realize that unlike the other exhibits, Lancelot and Camelot are not real. Larry and the others chase Lancelot to the theatre's roof, where the corrosion almost consumes the entire tablet, turning the exhibits back into their lifeless forms. The group tells Lancelot that although Camelot never existed, he can have a life. Lancelot gives the tablet back, allowing Larry to straighten the pieces as the moonlight restores the tablet's power and the exhibits. As the American exhibits prepare to return home, they decide that Ahkmenrah and his tablet should stay at the London Museum with his parents, even though this means the New York exhibits will no longer come to life. Larry is upset, but they all inform him that they are at peace with their unanimous decision. Ahkmenrah thanks Larry for reuniting him with his family, and the exhibits go home. Back in New York, Larry spends some final moments with his friends and says goodbye to them before the sun rises, and then he leaves the museum for the last time.

Three years later, Larry now works as a school teacher after the museum rehired McPhee. Tilly, the new night guard, brings a traveling exhibit to New York in a collaboration with the Museum of Natural History. In McPhee's office, Tilly hands the tablet to McPhee, showing him its power and allowing the exhibits to awaken again as they throw a huge party. From across the street, Larry quietly observes the celebration and smiles.

Cast

Humans

 Ben Stiller as Larry Daley, a security guard at the American Museum of Natural History.
 Ricky Gervais as Dr. McPhee, the director of the Museum of Natural History and Larry's boss.
 Rachael Harris as Madeline Phelps, the chairwoman of the American Museum of Natural History.
 Rebel Wilson as Tilly, the night security guard at the British Museum.
 Skyler Gisondo as Nick Daley, the son of Larry Daley. He was previously played by Jake Cherry in the previous films.
 Dick Van Dyke as Cecil Fredericks, a retired security guard from the first film.
 Percy Hynes White plays the younger Cecil "C.J" Fredericks in the prologue.
 Mickey Rooney as Gus, a retired security guard from the first film.
 Bill Cobbs as Reginald, a retired security guard from the first film.
 Andrea Martin as Rose, an archivist at the Museum of Natural History.
 Brennan Elliott as Robert Fredericks, C.J.'s father in the prologue.
 Matt Frewer as Archibald Stanley, an archeologist who accompanies Robert and Cecil in the prologue
 Hugh Jackman as himself (uncredited)
 Alice Eve as herself (uncredited)

Exhibits

 Ben Stiller as Laaa, a Neanderthal who was made to resemble Larry.
 Robin Williams as Theodore Roosevelt, the wax sculpture of the 26th President of the United States.
 Williams also voices Garuda.
 Rami Malek as Ahkmenrah, the mummy of an ancient pharaoh.
 Dan Stevens as Sir Lancelot, the wax statue of the legendary Knight of the Round Table.
 Ben Kingsley as Merenkahre, the mummy of an ancient pharaoh and Ahkmenrah's father.
 Steve Coogan as Octavius, a Roman soldier miniature and Jedediah's best friend.
 Owen Wilson as Jedediah, a cowboy diorama miniature and Octavius' best friend.
 Patrick Gallagher as Attila the Hun, the statue of the leader of the Huns.
 Mizuo Peck as Sacagawea, the polyurethane model of the Lemhi Shoshone woman who is Theodore Roosevelt's girlfriend.
 Anjali Jay as Shepseheret, the mummy of a Great Royal Wife of Merenkahre and Ahkmenrah's mother.
 Crystal the Monkey as Dexter, a stuffed Capuchin monkey.
 Brad Garrett (voice) as Moai, an Easter Island Head at the Museum of Natural History.
 Randy Lee, Darryl Quon, Gerald Wong, Paul Chih-Ping Cheng as wax models of Huns
 Matty Finochio as Roman Sentry
 Kerry van der Griend, Matthew Harrison, and Jody Racicot as wax model of Neanderthal

Production
On January 21, 2010, co-writer Thomas Lennon said to Access Hollywood, "I think it's a really outstanding idea to do Night at the Museum 3, in fact. I wonder if someone's not even already working on a script for that. I cannot confirm that for a fact, but I cannot deny it for a fact either... It might be in the works." In an October 2011 interview with The Hollywood Reporter, Stiller confirmed the sequel; however, he said that it was only in the "ideas stage". In February 2013 it was announced that the film, directed by Shawn Levy, would be released on December 25, 2014. On September 10, 2013, it was announced that shooting would start in February 2014.

On November 8, 2013, actor Dan Stevens was cast as Lancelot. On November 15, 2013, it was announced that Skyler Gisondo would be replacing Jake Cherry in the role of Nicky Daley. On December 18, 2013, it was announced that Stiller, Robin Williams, and Ricky Gervais would be returning for the sequel. On January 9, 2014, it was announced that Rebel Wilson would play a security guard in the British Museum. On January 14, 2014, the film's release date was moved up from December 25, 2014, to December 19, 2014. On January 23, 2014, it was announced Ben Kingsley would play an Egyptian Pharaoh at the British Museum. Principal photography and production began on January 27, 2014. On May 6, 2014, it was announced that the film would be titled Night at the Museum: Secret of the Tomb. In May 2014, principal photography ended. Shooting took place outside the British Museum in London, England, as well as on a sound stage at the Vancouver Film Studios in Vancouver, British Columbia for scenes taking place inside the museum. This film marks the final performances of Robin Williams and Mickey Rooney and is dedicated to their memories.

Music

Score
Alan Silvestri returned to score the final installment of the trilogy.

Varèse Sarabande released a soundtrack album of the score on January 6, 2015.

Soundtrack
Other songs not included on the album but used the film soundtrack:
 "Also sprach Zarathustra" By Richard Strauss.
 "Wizard" By Martin Garrix and Jay Hardway.
 "Shake Your Groove Thing" By Peaches & Herb.
 "London Calling" By The Clash.
 "Dancing Queen" By A-Teens.
 "(I've Had) The Time of My Life" By Bill Medley and Jennifer Warnes.
 "Got to Be Real" By Cheryl Lynn.
 "Let's Go" By Tiesto featuring Icona Pop.

Release
The film premiered at the Ziegfeld Theatre in New York City on December 11, 2014. The movie was released alongside Annie on December 19, 2014, in the United States by 20th Century Fox.

Reception

Box office

Night at the Museum: Secret of the Tomb grossed $113.7 million in North America, and $249.5 million in other territories, for a worldwide total of $363.2 million against a budget of $127 million.

In North America, early analysts were predicting a potential $25–$28 million opening. In North America, the film was released on December 19, 2014, across 3,785 theaters. It opened Friday, December 19, 2014, and earned $5.6 million on its opening day, placing at number three at the box office. The film underperformed expectations during its opening weekend, earning $17.1 million, which was relatively lower than the openings of the original film ($30.4 million) and its sequel ($54.1 million). The film debuted at number two at the box office behind The Hobbit: The Battle of the Five Armies. According to 20th Century Fox, the movie's audience was 51% male, with 54% of the audience under the age of 25. Audiences polled by CinemaScore during the opening weekend, gave the film an average grade of "B+", on an A+ to F scale.

The film began its international rollout the same weekend as the North American premiere and earned $10.4 million from 27 markets in its opening weekend, debuting at #3 behind at the box office behind The Hobbit: The Battle of the Five Armies and Penguins of Madagascar. The film expanded to an additional 40 markets in its second week and grossed $31.2 million. It topped the box office outside North America in its fourth weekend with a total gross of $46.2 million, primarily because of China, where it opened at #1 with $26 million. The other highest opening figures were from Mexico ($5.85 million), Brazil ($3.1 million), Malaysia ($3.07 million), the UK ($3 million), Australia ($2.8 million), Germany ($2.1 million) and Singapore ($2 million).

For the weekend of January 16, 2015, the film grossed $17.8 million, which includes a $3.9 million debut in South Korea.

Critical response
On Rotten Tomatoes, the film received a  approval rating, based on 115 reviews, with an average score of 4.9/10. The site's critical consensus reads, "While not without its moments, Night at the Museum: Secret of the Tomb is a less-than-inspired sendoff for the trilogy." On Metacritic, the film has a score of 47 out of 100, based on 33 critics, indicating "mixed or average reviews". 

Scott Foundas of Variety gave the film a positive review, praising the visual effects and calling the production values "topnotch", and admiring Guillermo Navarro's work. He added, "A most enjoyable capper to director Shawn Levy and producer Chris Columbus' cheerfully silly and sneakily smart family-entertainment juggernaut... offers little in the way of secrets of surprises, but should add much holiday cheer to Fox's box-office coffers." Peter Bradshaw of The Guardian gave the film three stars out of five and said, "The third part in what absolutely no one is calling the Night at the Museum 'trilogy' turns out to be a good-natured and entertainingly surreal panto fantasy." Glenn Kenny awarded the film 2½ stars out of 4 praising the Indiana Jones themed-set while criticizing the performances of the cast and said, "As talent-packed as any Night at the Museum picture may be—in this third installment... —one doesn't come to a movie of this sort expecting anybody's best work. Or at least one certainly shouldn't, because it won't materialize." Stephanie Zacharek of The Village Voice gave the film a positive review, saying "The third installment, Night at the Museum: Secret of the Tomb may be the best, and even the generally wound-too-tight Ben Stiller – once again playing a bemused Museum of Natural History guard – is easy to tolerate." Claudia Puig of USA Today gave the film two and a half stars out of four, saying "Where the previous films felt frenetic and forced, this outing feels breezier, more enjoyable and less contrived." Joe Neumaier of the New York Daily News gave the film three out of five stars, saying "There's a serenity to museum visits, especially if it's a place you know and love. Night at the Museum: Secret of the Tomb, amazingly, recaptures that feeling in big-studio franchise form."

Bill Goodykoontz of The Arizona Republic gave the film two out of five stars, saying "Night at the Museum: Secret of the Tomb is a rather lackluster affair, a cash grab that tries to aim a little higher but confuses sappy shortcuts with real emotion." Joe McGovern of Entertainment Weekly gave the film a B, saying "It's kind of fun, unembarrassingly, and not least of all because the people who made it look like they had a good time doing so." Tom Long of The Detroit News gave the film a B, saying "There are some key elements that make this Night at the Museum sequel work better than its predecessor." Stephen Whitty of the Newark Star-Ledger gave the film two out of four stars, saying "The exhibits in this Night at the Museum may still come to life nightly. But their latest movie stays stubbornly inert." Tom Russo of The Boston Globe gave the film two and a half stars out of four, saying "Seeing Ben Stiller, the late Robin Williams, and their magically roused gang together again, this time in London, is initially all about indulgent, nostalgic smiles rather than new wows. But then comes the movie's exceptionally clever and fresh final act, which delivers genuine surprise along with many laughs." Robbie Collin of The Daily Telegraph gave the film three out of five stars, saying "The third Night at the Museum film starts strongly, with its heart in the past... It's an exciting opening, and perhaps too exciting for the film's own good. It's hard not to be disappointed when the plot moves back to the present and settles into the time-honoured formula of digitised creatures running riot and famous people in fancy dress doing shtick." Michael Rechtshaffen of The Hollywood Reporter gave the film a negative review, saying "Despite relocating across the pond to the esteemed British Museum, the creaky Night at the Museum: Secret of the Tomb fails to capitalize on the comic potential provided by that change of venue."

Ignatiy Vishnevetsky of The A.V. Club gave the film a C+, saying "Secret of the Tomb plays it as a source of corny jokes, pop-culture references, and father-son bonding moments. In other words, it's exactly the kind of film that shouldn't be expected to engage with its assorted bizarre subtexts – but what a movie it could be if it did." Sara Stewart of the New York Post gave the film two out of four stars, saying "For piquing kids' interest in history and nature, you could do worse than this goofy Ben Stiller franchise. But its third installment is more meh than manic, too reliant on wide shots of the ragtag Museum of Natural History cohorts striding down corridors. You get the feeling returning director Shawn Levy is ready to hang it up." Richard Roeper of the Chicago Sun-Times gave the film one and a half stars out of five, saying "The dialogue is schmaltzy and often painfully unfunny. The special effects are often so 1980s-bad, one wonders if it was a deliberate choice, to make the creepy visuals of sculptures dancing and paintings moving less frightening to young viewers. Time and again, terrific actors sink in the equivalent of cinematic quicksand, helpless against the sucking sound of this movie." Drew Hunt of Slant Magazine gave the film one out of four stars, saying "None of the entries in the Night at the Museum series could ever pass for high art, but a wealth of comedic talent gave the first two installments a madcap energy that somewhat forgave their childish premises. Night at the Museum: Secret of the Tomb, the third and supposedly final edition in the franchise, is nothing more than an uncomfortably transparent contractual obligation."

Accolades

Sequel

In August 2019, following the purchase of 21st Century Fox and its assets by The Walt Disney Company, Disney CEO Bob Iger announced that a fully animated sequel to Night at the Museum is in development. The project will be released as a Disney+ exclusive film, as a production by Walt Disney Pictures.

In October 2020, the movie was officially titled Night at the Museum: Kahmunrah Rises Again. The project is traditionally animated and was scheduled to be released in 2021. The plot centers around Larry's son, Nick, who is hesitant to follow in his father's footsteps as nightwatchman. In addition to Nick and the titular villain, the movie will also feature returning characters: Jedediah, Octavius, Teddy Roosevelt and Sacagawea with the addition of Joan of Arc. Production began on November 2, 2020. Shawn Levy will serve as executive producer, but the majority of the original cast were initially not expected to return.

In August 2021, the film was delayed to a 2022 release date. In September 2022, Matt Danner revealed he was directing the film; he previously was the creator and showrunner of the Disney animated show Legend of the Three Caballeros (2018). The film was released on December 9, 2022.

Home media
Night at the Museum: Secret of the Tomb was released on Blu-ray and DVD on March 10, 2015. The film debuted in second place on the home media charts behind The Hunger Games: Mockingjay – Part 1.

References

External links

 
 
 

2014 comedy films
2014 fantasy films
2010s adventure comedy films
2010s children's adventure films
2010s English-language films
2010s fantasy comedy films
1492 Pictures films
21 Laps Entertainment films
20th Century Fox films
20th Century Fox animated films
American adventure comedy films
American children's adventure films
American fantasy adventure films
American fantasy comedy films
American sequel films
American slapstick comedy films
British Museum in media
Cultural depictions of Theodore Roosevelt
Cultural depictions of Sacagawea
Cultural depictions of Attila the Hun
Films directed by Shawn Levy
Films produced by Chris Columbus
Films scored by Alan Silvestri
Films set in 1938
Films set in 2014
Films set in 2017
Films set in Egypt
Films set in London
Films set in museums
Films set in New York City
Films shot in London
American films with live action and animation
IMAX films
Night at the Museum
Slapstick films
TSG Entertainment films
2010s American films